Yang Seung-ho (born November 15, 2000), known professionally as Sokodomo (stylized in all lowercase), is a South Korean rapper and songwriter. He first garnered attention when he appeared on High School Rapper 3 in 2019. He signed with Sony Music where released the extended plays WWW.III (2019) and ...---... (2021). In 2021, he appeared on Show Me the Money 10 where he released the single "Merry-Go-Round" which peaked at number one on the Gaon Digital Chart.

Early life 
Yang Seung-ho was born on November 15, 2000 in Yeongdeungpo-gu, Seoul to a Korean father and Japanese mother. He had lived in the United States when he was young and spent his teenage years in São Paulo and Rio de Janeiro. He graduated from Sunrin Internet High School.

His stage name "Sokodomo" means "Korean child" as it is a portmanteau of  "South Korea" and "kodomo"(こども, Japanese word for child).

Career

2019–2020: High School Rapper 3 and signing to Sony Music 
In February 2019, Sokodomo appeared on the rap competition TV show High School Rapper 3 where he first garnered attention. He released singles "Mirror", "U.F.O", "Freedumb" and "Global Extinction" on the show and finished in sixth place. In June 2019, he signed to Sony Music. In December 2019, he released his debut extended play WWW.III. In 2020, he was nominated for New Artist of the Year at the Korean Hip-hop Awards.

2021–2022: Show Me the Money 10 and "Merry-Go-Round" 
In 2021, Sokodomo appeared on the rap competition TV show Show Me the Money 10 where his released the single "Merry-Go-Round" featuring singers Zion.T and Wonstein. It peaked at number one on the Gaon Digital Chart and became his most successful single. He finished the show in the top 8.

Discography

Extended plays

Singles

Filmography

TV

Awards and nominations

References

External link 

 
2000 births
Living people
Musicians from Seoul
Show Me the Money (South Korean TV series) contestants
South Korean male rappers
Sony Music artists